İstanbul Kültür University (İKÜ) is one of the many private universities located in Istanbul, Turkey.  It has a total of four campuses all in close proximity to each other in the western part of Istanbul. The three campuses are located in Şirinevler, İncirli, Basın Ekspres and Ataköy
This non-profit University was founded in 1997; its Industrial Engineering started in the 1997–98 academic year. The university has five schools and two vocational schools. In 2009, Global Political Trends Center, a policy oriented research (think tank) institution, was founded under the auspices of the university.

Istanbul Kültür University conducts its academic and scientific activities with a total of 59 departments and programs, in eight faculties, namely Faculty of Science and Letters, Faculty of Education, Faculty of Arts and Design, Faculty of Law, Faculty of Economic and Administrative Sciences, Faculty of Architecture, Faculty of Engineering and Faculty of Health Sciences, and in two vocational schools, namely Vocational School and Vocational School of Justice. In addition, it provides postgraduate education at 54 Master's and 11 Ph.D. programs within the body of the Institute

İKÜ faculties

Faculty of Law 

Faculty Dean: Prof. Dr. Dr. h.c. mult. Bahri Öztürk

 Department of Law

Faculty of Economics and Administrative Sciences 

Faculty Dean: Prof. Dr. Ali Sen
Faculty Vice Dean: Assist. Prof Nazan Çaglar

 Entrepreneurship
 Economics
 Business Administration (Turkish/English)
 International Trade (Turkish/English)
 International Relations (English)

Faculty of Art and Design 

Faculty Dean:  Prof. Dr. Mehmet Üstünipek
Faculty Vice Dean:  Prof. Dr. Isil Zeybek
Faculty Vice Dean: Assist. Prof Ibrahim Zengin

 Cartoon and Animation
 Communication Arts
 Communication Design
 Arts Management
 Cinema and Television
 New Media and Communication

Faculty of Architecture 
Faculty Dean: Prof. Dr. Neslihan Dostoglu
Faculty Vice Dean: Prof. Dr. Esra Bostancioglu
Faculty Vice Dean: Assoc. Prof. Rana Kutlu

 Architecture
 Interior Architecture and Environmental Design

Faculty of Engineering 

Faculty Dean: Prof.Dr. Ahmet Murat Türk

Faculty Vice Dean: Assist. Prof. I. Ethem Tarhan

 Electrical&Electronics Engineering
 Industrial Engineering
 Computer Engineering
 Civil Engineering

Faculty of Science and Letters 

Faculty Dean: Prof. Dr. Çimen Atak
Faculty Vice Dean: Assist. Prof. Derya Altinmakas
Faculty Vice Dean: Assist. Prof. Kayhan Sahan

 Physics
 English Language and Literature
 Mathematics-Computer Sciences
 Molecular Biology and Genetics
 Psychology
 Turkish Language and Literature

Faculty of Education 

Faculty Dean: Prof. Dr. Rauf Yildiz
Faculty Vice Dean: Assoc. Prof. Sultan Bilge Keskinkiliç Kara
Faculty Vice Dean: Assist. Prof. Halime Eker

 Educational Sciences
 Basic Education
 Foreign Languages Education

Faculty of Health Sciences 

Faculty Dean: Prof. Dr. Nazif Ekin Akalan
 Department of Physiotherapy and Rehabilitation
 Department of Nutrition and Dietetics
 Department of Nursing

Vocational Schools

Vocational School of Justice 

Vocational School Director: Assist Prof. Durmus Tezcan

 Justice Program

Vocational school 

Vocational School Director: Assist. Prof. Sinan Kesici

 Alternative Energy Sources
 Banking and Insurance (Formal)
 Banking and Insurance (Evening Education)
 Computer Programming
 Office Management and Executive Assistance
 Child Development
 Foreign Trade
 Digital Media and Marketing 
 Electronics Technology
 Household Linens
 Graphic Design
 Public Relations and Publicity
 Air Logistics 
 Air Conditioning and Cooling Technology
 Construction Technology
 Business Management
 Logistics
 Fashion Design
 Opticianry
 Radio and Television Technology
 Management of Health Institutions 
 Civil Air Transportation Management 
 Civil Aviation Cabin Services
 Medical Documentation and Secretarial
 Tourism and Hotel Management
 Aircraft Technology
 Flight Operations Management 
 Graduate Studies

Institute of Graduate Studies 

Institute Director:  Prof. Dr. Remzi Tunç Misirlioglu

M.S/M.A Programs 
 Computer Engineering
 Educational Management And Planning 
 Electrical&Electronics Engineering
 Physics
 Geotechnics
 Interior Architecture
 Communication Arts
 Occupational Health and Safety
 Business Administration
 Business Management
 Public Law
 Mathematics-Computer
 Architectural Design
 Molecular Biology And Genetics
 Engineering Management
 Engineering Management
 Private Law
 Monetary and Capital Markets 
 Project Management
 Arts Management
 Sports Law
 Turkish Language and Literature
 International Relations
 Production Economics
 Construction
 Construction
 Construction Management And Technology
 Managerial Economics

PhD programs 
 Geotechnics PhD Program
 Business Administration PhD Program
 Public Law PhD Program
 Mathematics PhD Program
 Architecture PhD Program
 Molecular Biology And Genetics PhD Program
 Private Law PhD Program
 Project Management PhD Program
 Turkish Language and Literature PhD Program
 Construction PhD Program

Application and research centers 
Research activities at IKU are carried out within the body of research centers as well as faculties and institutes. Research centers are organized as institutions affiliated to the rectorate, and multidisciplinary research is carried out in these centers with the activities of implementing commercial and industrial organizations.

 AGMER - Family Businesses and Entrepreneurship Application and Research Center
 ATAMER - Atatürk's Principles and the History of the Turkish Revolution Research and Application Center 
 R&D Center
 CEHAMER - Criminal Law Application and Research Center 
 FIHAMER - Intellectual Property Rights Application and Research Center
 GEOMER - Geomatics Application and Research Center
 GSUAM - Fine Arts Application and Research Center 
 IKÜ-HAM - Istanbul Kültür University, Motion Analysis Application and Evaluation, Application and Research Center
 IKÜSEM - Continuing Education Center
 IKÜTÜMER - Turkish and Foreign Languages Teaching Application and Research Center
 PDR - Psychological Counseling and Guidance
 UZEMER - Distance Education Application and Research Center

European and International Relations Center 
European and International Center (EIC), which conducts Istanbul Kültür University's relations with universities and higher education institutions abroad, works both for various international higher education institutions, especially universities in 27 countries that have become a member of the European Union that Turkey is a candidate for full membership and it also works in the fields of mutual cooperation activities, structuring and executing corporate projects. Lifelong Learning Program - LLP Institution Coordinator-ship offers IKU students the opportunity to study at more than 100 universities abroad and to do internships in international companies. Within the scope of Template:Olgu Lifelong Learning Program, there are also many EU Education Programs such as LEONARDO, which is a vocational education program, and GRUNDTVIG for adults, and JEAN MONNET studies as well as ERASMUS program.

Life on campus 
İstanbul Kültür University provides education on four campuses Ataköy, Şirinevler, İncirli and Basın Ekspres. Faculty of Science and Letters, Faculty of Engineering, Faculty of Architecture and Faculty of Art and Design are on Ataköy Campus; Faculty of Economics and Administrative Sciences and Faculty of Education are on Basın Ekpres Campus; Faculty of Law, Faculty of Health Sciences, Vocational School of Justice and English Preparatory Classes are on Şirinevler Campus; and Vocational School is on İncirli Campus. Transportation between campuses is provided by shuttle service.

On campuses, students are provided with the opportunity to have their meals and other needs.

In the morning and evening, shuttle services to Bakırköy Seabus are provided for the students who come from Kadıköy and Bostancı.

Foreign relations
İKÜ is a member of the Caucasus Universities Association.

References 

Educational institutions established in 1997
Istanbul Kültür University
1997 establishments in Turkey
Private universities and colleges in Turkey
Bakırköy